Women vs. Men is a 2011 Italian comedy film directed by Fausto Brizzi.

The film is a sequel to 2010 Men vs. Women (Maschi contro femmine).

Cast

References

External links

2011 films
Films directed by Fausto Brizzi
Films scored by Bruno Zambrini
Films set in Turin
2010s Italian-language films
2011 comedy films
Italian comedy films
2010s Italian films